Maria Tomé de Araujo is a São Toméan politician. She was serving as Minister of Labor, Solidarity, Women, & Family Affairs under Prime Minister Rafael Branco. She later became Minister of Health and Social Affairs under the decree by president Manuel Pinto da Costa on 21 January 2014.

References

Year of birth missing (living people)
Living people
Government ministers of São Tomé and Príncipe
Women government ministers of São Tomé and Príncipe
21st-century women politicians
21st-century São Tomé and Príncipe politicians